Spit Burger Lottery is an album by Jimmie's Chicken Shack.

Track listing
 "Milk" – 5:03
 "Blood" – 3:40
 "When You Die You're Dead" – 2:42
 "Schoolbus" – 2:42
 "Stop" – 3:14
 "10 Miles" – 2:52
 "Another Day" - 3:09
 "Get Off" – 2:54
 "Again" – 3:32
 "Rory's dead" - 1:20 hidden track

Music by Jimmie's Chicken Shack
Lyrics by Jimi Haha

Personnel
Jimmie's Chicken Shack
Jimi Haha – gitfiddle, clucker
Jim McD – gitfiddle
Jim Chaney – drumsticks & skins
Che Colavita Lemon – bassting

1994 albums
Jimmie's Chicken Shack albums